Omninablautus is a genus of robber flies in the family Asilidae.

Species
 Omninablautus arenosus Pritchard, 1935
 Omninablautus nigronotum (Wilcox, 1935)
 Omninablautus tolandi (Wilcox, 1966)

References

Asilidae genera
Diptera of North America